World Conference on Women may refer to:
 First World Conference on Women, Mexico City, 1975
 Second World Conference on Women, Copenhagen, 1980 
 Third World Conference on Women, Nairobi, 1985 
 Fourth World Conference on Women, Beijing, 1995

See also 
 World Conference (disambiguation)